is a private university in Suzuka, Mie, Japan, established in 1994. Suzuka Junior College is located on the same campus.

External links
 Official website 

Educational institutions established in 1994
Private universities and colleges in Japan
Universities and colleges in Mie Prefecture
1994 establishments in Japan